The following is a list of events from the year 1702 in Japan.

Incumbents
Monarch: Higashiyama

Births
 January 14 - Emperor Nakamikado (d. 1737)

Deaths 
 Hon'inbō Dōsaku

 
1700s in Japan
Years of the 18th century in Japan